Didube may refer to: 

 The Didube Pantheon
Didube (district)
 The station Didube (Tbilisi Metro)
  in Tbilisi